Laurene Powell Jobs ( Powell; born November 6, 1963) is an American billionaire businesswoman and executive. She is the founder and chair of Emerson Collective and XQ Institute. She is the widow of Steve Jobs, co-founder and former CEO of Apple Inc., and she manages the Steve Jobs Trust. She has recently been a major donor to Democratic Party politicians.

Early life and career
Powell Jobs was raised in West Milford, New Jersey. She earned a B.A. in political science from the University of Pennsylvania School of Arts and Sciences and a B.S. degree in economics from the Wharton School of the University of Pennsylvania in 1985. She received her MBA degree from the Stanford Graduate School of Business in 1991.

Early career
Powell Jobs co-founded Terravera, a natural foods company that sold to retailers throughout Northern California. She also served on the board of directors of Achieva, which created online tools to help students study more effectively at standardized testing. Before business school, Powell Jobs worked for Merrill Lynch Asset Management and spent three years at Goldman Sachs as a fixed-income trading strategist.

Steve Jobs's death
On October 5, 2011, at the age of 56, Steve Jobs, the CEO of Apple, died due to complications from a relapse of islet cell neuroendocrine pancreatic cancer. Powell Jobs inherited the Steven P. Jobs Trust, which as of May 2013 had a 7.3% stake in The Walt Disney Company worth about $12.1 billion, and 38.5 million shares of Apple Inc.

, Powell Jobs and her family were ranked 59th in the Forbes''' annual list of the world's billionaires and 30th in Forbes 400. According to the same list, she is the wealthiest woman in the technology industry.

Later career and activism
In 2004, Powell Jobs founded the Emerson Collective, a private company structured as a Limited Liability Company, that supports social entrepreneurs and organizations working in education and immigration reform, social justice, media, and journalism and conservation through partnerships, grants, and investments. Through Emerson, Powell Jobs owns The Atlantic and a stake in Axios.

In the 2016 U.S. presidential election, Powell Jobs donated $2 million to Hillary Clinton and raised a further $4 million for her.

Powell Jobs was an early investor in, and board member of, Ozy.  In addition, Ozy credited her as a "contributor."

In 1997, Powell Jobs co-founded College Track together with Carlos Watson.

In 2017, Powell Jobs purchased a 20 percent stake in the ownership group Monumental Sports & Entertainment, which holds the NBA's Washington Wizards, NHL's Washington Capitals, and Capital One Arena. She was the second-largest shareholder behind chairman Ted Leonsis.

Also in 2017, she backed the founding of the political organization ACRONYM, which raised ethical questions for Powell Jobs for its creation of Courier Newsroom.

In 2018, she issued a statement that the book Small Fry by her stepdaughter Lisa Brennan contains false information about Steve Jobs as a father.

Philanthropy

In 1997, Powell Jobs and Carlos Watson co-founded College Track, a nonprofit organization in East Palo Alto to improve high school graduation, college enrollment, and college graduation rates for "underserved" students.

Of College Track's high school graduates, many of whom are first-generation college students, about 90 percent attend four-year colleges, and 70 percent finish college in six years, whereas the national average for first-generation college students is 24 percent. College Track has facilities in East Palo Alto, Sacramento, San Francisco, Oakland, Watts, Boyle Heights, New Orleans, Aurora, Colorado, Denver, and the Washington, D.C., area. "We have a wait list of five cities where we'd like to open up centers," Powell Jobs has said. "We want to keep our standards high, though, and are reluctant to grow through franchising or through dissemination of our curriculum and training."

In September 2015, Powell Jobs launched a $50 million project to create high schools with new approaches to education. Called XQ: The Super School Project, the initiative aims to inspire teams of educators, students, and community leaders to create and implement new plans for high schools. Efforts include altering school schedules, curriculums and technologies in order to replace the country's century-old high school education model. Funding for XQ comes from Powell Jobs' Emerson Collective. Following an initial $50 million financial contribution, XQ announced an additional contribution, awarding ten schools $10 million each, for a total financial contribution of $100 million. The schools were chosen from approximately 700 submissions nationwide. Powell Jobs's team of advisors is led by Russlynn H. Ali.

Powell Jobs is a founding member of the Climate Leadership Council. As of 2018, Powell Jobs sits on the board of directors of College Track, Conservation International, and Stanford University. She is chair of the board of directors of XQ and also sits on the chairman's advisory board of the Council on Foreign Relations. In 2014, she was ranked as the 29th most powerful woman in the world by Forbes. Her ranking rose from #39 in 2013.

Powell Jobs's philanthropy has been described as of limited "transparency and accountability." In 2019, Powell Jobs was designated the "Least Transparent Mega-Giver" by Inside Philanthropy''.

Personal life
In October 1989, Steve Jobs gave a "View from the Top" lecture at Stanford Business School. Laurene Powell was a new MBA student and sneaked to the front of the lecture and started up a conversation with Jobs, who was seated next to her. They subsequently had dinner together that night. A year and a half later, on March 18, 1991, they married in a ceremony at the Ahwahnee Hotel in Yosemite National Park. Presiding over the wedding was Kōbun Chino Otogawa, a Zen Buddhist monk. 

Powell Jobs resides in Palo Alto, California. 
She and Steve Jobs had three children together: son Reed (born September 1991) and daughters Erin (born 1995) and Eve (born 1998). Laurene is also the stepmother of Lisa Brennan-Jobs (born 1978), Steve's daughter from a previous relationship.

References

External links

 
"Laurene Powell Jobs, Emerson Collective: Profile and Biography", Bloomberg Markets
"Bloomberg Billionaires Index - Laurene Powell Jobs", Bloomberg
"Board Member Laurene Powell Jobs", Council on Foreign Relations

1963 births
American billionaires
American philanthropists
American women business executives
Businesspeople from the San Francisco Bay Area
California Democrats
Female billionaires
Family of Steve Jobs
Goldman Sachs people
Living people
National Basketball Association executives
National Basketball Association owners
National Hockey League executives
National Hockey League owners
People from Palo Alto, California
People from West Milford, New Jersey
Stanford University alumni
Stanford University trustees
The Atlantic (magazine) people
Washington Capitals owners
Washington Mystics owners
Washington Wizards owners
Wharton School of the University of Pennsylvania alumni
American women company founders
American company founders
Women's National Basketball Association executives